"Mourn You Til I Join You" is a single by Naughty by Nature from the Ride soundtrack. It was released on October 28, 1997 and was their last release for Tommy Boy Records. The song was dedicated to the group's friend, Tupac Shakur and was about lead rapper, Treach's relationship with Tupac. The song was a minor success, peaking at 51 on the Billboard Hot 100 and 2 on the Hot Rap Singles. The song was originally set to appear on 1997's Nothing to Lose soundtrack, but Tommy Boy instead chose to include it on 1998's Ride soundtrack.

Track listing

A-side
"Mourn You Til I Join You" (Album Version) – 5:18
"Mourn You Til I Join You" (Instrumental) – 5:04

B-side
"Nothing to Lose (Naughty Live)" (Album Version) – 4:10
"Nothing to Lose (Naughty Live)" (Instrumental) – 4:10

Charts

References

1997 singles
Naughty by Nature songs
Commemoration songs
Song recordings produced by Naughty by Nature
1997 songs
Tommy Boy Records singles